The Garden That Tilts  (French: Le Jardin qui bascule) is a 1974 French drama film directed by Guy Gilles.

Cast
Philippe Chemin	 ... 	Roland
Guy Bedos	... 	Maurice Garcia
Caroline Cartier	... 	Sophie
Pierre Fabre	... 	L'homme du banc
Anouk Ferjac	... 	Nanou Garcia
Sami Frey	... 	Michel
Patrick Jouané	... 	Karl
Ludovic Lutard	... 	Titi
Jeanne Moreau	... 	Maria
Jean-Marie Proslier	... 	Le patron du bistrot
Delphine Seyrig	... 	Kate
Howard Vernon	... 	Paul

External links
 

1974 films
1970s French-language films
1974 drama films
Films directed by Guy Gilles
French drama films
1970s French films